Carol Dempster (December 9, 1901 – February 1, 1991) was an American film actress of the silent film era. She appeared in films from 1916 to 1926, working with D. W. Griffith extensively.

Early years
Born in Duluth, Minnesota, Dempster was the daughter of a captain on the Great Lakes and the youngest of four children. The family moved to California when her father decided to change careers. While dancing in a school program, Dempster was noticed by Ruth St. Denis and went on to become the youngest graduate in the first class of St. Denis's school of dance.

Career 
Dempster got her start in films as a protégé of legendary film director D. W. Griffith alongside other Griffith actresses of the mid-1910s, Lillian and Dorothy Gish and Mae Marsh. Griffith gave Dempster her first role at age 15 in his 1916 film Intolerance playing one of the Babylonian harem girls alongside another teenaged newcomer, Mildred Harris. Dempster eventually became one of Griffith's "favorites"; he cast her in nearly every one of his films throughout the 1920s, allegedly to the irritation of Mae Marsh and Lillian Gish. Dempster became romantically involved with the much older Griffith during the early 1920s while Griffith was estranged from his wife, Linda Arvidson. 

Dempster's first feature role came in 1919 in the Griffith directed The Girl Who Stayed at Home opposite Robert "Bobby" Harron. Dempster followed this with Griffith's The Love Flower (1920), Dream Street (1921), One Exciting Night (1922) and Isn't Life Wonderful (1924), America (1924), Sally of the Sawdust (1925), and That Royle Girl (1925). Dempster appeared opposite such notable actors as John Barrymore, Richard Barthelmess, William Powell, Ivor Novello, and W. C. Fields.

In 1926 Dempster acted in her final film, a Griffith vehicle entitled The Sorrows of Satan (1926), co-starring Adolphe Menjou, Ricardo Cortez, and the Hungarian vamp Lya De Putti. Dempster then retired from the screen to marry wealthy banker Edwin S. Larson in 1926.

Dempster's critical stock was never very high, in part because she was unable to live up to the performances of Lillian Gish, whom she replaced as Griffith's leading lady. Her somewhat "ordinary" appearance and animated acting style were frequently criticized. Also, with a few exceptions, the films she appeared in were not among Griffith's more popular works. In recent years, however, viewers and critics alike have slowly begun to appreciate her performances, particularly in two later films, Isn't Life Wonderful and The Sorrows of Satan.

Death 
Dempster died in La Jolla, California, in 1991 at the age of 89 from heart failure and was buried at the Forest Lawn Memorial Park cemetery in Glendale, California. Upon her death, Dempster left $1.6 million to the San Diego Museum of Art, which was used to expand the museum's collections of prints and drawings.

Filmography

All features were directed by D. W. Griffith except Sherlock Holmes, which was directed by Albert Parker. The Hope Chest, a product of the New Art Film Company from 1918, was produced by Griffith but directed by Elmer Clifton.

Footnotes

Sources 

Koszarski, Richard. 2008. Hollywood on the Hudson: Film and Television in New York from Griffith to Sarnoff. Rutgers University Press.

External links

Carol Dempster at Golden Silents
Carol Dempster at Virtual History

1901 births
1991 deaths
American film actresses
American silent film actresses
Actresses from Duluth, Minnesota
20th-century American actresses
Burials at Forest Lawn Memorial Park (Glendale)